Salboni Government College, established in 2014,. is a government general degree college in Salboni, Paschim Medinipur district. It offers different undergraduate courses in arts and science. It is affiliated to Vidyasagar University.

Location
This college is situated in Koyma, Bhimpur, a village of Salboni Block.

Departments

Sciences

Physics
Chemistry
Mathematics

Arts

Bengali
English
History
Philosophy
Sanskrit
Political Science
Sociology
Santali

See also

References

External links
 Salboni Government College

Universities and colleges in Paschim Medinipur district
Colleges affiliated to Vidyasagar University
Educational institutions established in 2012
2012 establishments in West Bengal